The 1981 Individual Ice Speedway World Championship was the 16th edition of the World Championship  The Championship was held on 7/8 March 1981 in Assen in the Netherlands.

The winner was Vladimir Lyubich of the Soviet Union.

Classification

See also 
 1981 Individual Speedway World Championship in classic speedway
 1981 Team Ice Racing World Championship

References 

Ice speedway competitions
World